The modern Summer Olympic Games have been held every four years since the first Games in 1896 (except 1916 due to the First World War, 1940 and 1944 due to the Second World War, and 2020 due to the COVID-19 pandemic) and Olympic records are recognised by the International Olympic Committee (IOC) in each event.  The athletics events, which take place at each Games, are divided into four groups: track events (including sprints, middle- and long-distance running, hurdling and relays), field events (including javelin, discus, hammer, pole vault, long and triple jumps), road events (such as walks and the marathon) and combined events (the heptathlon and the decathlon).  Women compete in 23 athletics events during the Games, and men compete in 24; while 21 of the events are the same for both men and women, men exclusively compete in the 50 km walk, the women's combined event is the heptathlon while the men compete in the decathlon, and the short distance hurdles for women is contested over 100 m, ten metres shorter than the men's event.

Some Olympic records have been broken but later rescinded by the IOC.  In 1988, Canadian sprinter Ben Johnson broke the Olympic and World record in the 100 metres sprint, but was subsequently disqualified after it was discovered that he had used anabolic steroids to enhance his performance.  His record was expunged and the gold medal was instead awarded to original silver medalist American Carl Lewis. Hungarian athlete Róbert Fazekas broke the Olympic record in the men's discus in 2004 but was later stripped of both his gold medal and the record after it was deemed that he had "committed an anti-doping rule violation".

The longest standing modern Olympic athletics record is Bob Beamon's achievement in the men's long jump at the 1968 Summer Olympics.

Note, only those events currently competed for and recognised by the IOC as Summer Olympic events are listed.

Men's records

♦ denotes a performance that is also a current world record.  Statistics are correct as of August 3, 2021.

Women's records

♦ denotes a performance that is also a current world record.  Statistics are correct as of July 31, 2021.

Mixed records

See also

 List of world records in athletics

References

External links
 
 

records
Olympic records
Athletics